John Andrew Savidge (18 December 1924 – 26 December 1979) was a British track and field athlete who specialised in the shot put.

Athletics career
He competed in the 1952 Summer Olympics. and finished in sixth place. He was born in Nottingham.

He was England's first ever champion in the event. He also competed at the European Athletics Championships for Great Britain in 1950 and 1954.

He won the shot put at the AAA Championships for three consecutive years (1952–54).

References

1924 births
1979 deaths
British male shot putters
English male shot putters
Sportspeople from Nottingham
Olympic athletes of Great Britain
Athletes (track and field) at the 1952 Summer Olympics
Commonwealth Games gold medallists for England
Commonwealth Games medallists in athletics
Athletes (track and field) at the 1954 British Empire and Commonwealth Games
Medallists at the 1954 British Empire and Commonwealth Games